
The List of aircraft in the Smithsonian Institution includes aircraft exhibited in the Smithsonian Institution's National Air and Space Museum, Steven F. Udvar-Hazy Center, and the Paul E. Garber Preservation, Restoration, and Storage Facility. The Smithsonian Institution's collection of aircraft and spacecraft is the largest on display in the world.

Aircraft displayed at the National Air and Space Museum

The original location for the display of the Smithsonian's collection of aerospace artifacts is the National Air and Space Museum, located on the National Mall in Washington, D.C. Most of the more famous artifacts in the collection are displayed here, including the Wright Flyer, Charles Lindbergh's Spirit of St. Louis, and the Apollo 11 Command Module Columbia.

 AAI RQ-7A Shadow
 Albatros D.Va
 Beechcraft C17L Staggerwing
 Bell X-1 Glamorous Glennis
 Bell XP-59A Airacomet
 Bleriot XI
 Boeing 247D
 Boeing 747 – Nose Only
 Boeing F4B-4
 Boeing X-45A Elsie May
  Curtiss Model D "Headless Pusher" – Replica
 Curtiss R3C-2
 Curtiss Robin J-1 Ole Miss
 De Havilland DH-4
 Douglas A-4C Skyhawk
 Douglas D-558-2 Skyrocket
 Douglas DC-3
 Douglas DC-7 – Nose Only
 Douglas SBD-6 Dauntless
 Douglas World Cruiser DWC-2 Chicago 
 Ecker Flying Boat
 Fairchild FC-2
 Fokker D.VII
 Fokker T-2
 Ford 5-AT Tri-Motor
 Grumman FM-1 Wildcat
 Hughes H-1 Racer
 Lilienthal Normalsegelapparat
 Lockheed F-104A Starfighter
 Lockheed Martin RQ-3 DarkStar
 Lockheed Model 8 Sirius Tingmissartoq
 Lockheed U-2C
 Lockheed Vega 5B
 Lockheed Vega 5C Winnie Mae
 Lockheed XP-80 Shooting Star Lulu Belle
 Macchi C.202 Folgore
 McDonnell FH-1 Phantom
 Messerschmitt Bf 109 G-6/R3
 Messerschmitt Me 262 A-1a Swallow
 Mitsubushi A6M5 Model 52 Zero
 North American P-51D Mustang
 North American X-15
 Northrop 4A Alpha
 Northrop Gamma Polar Star
 Northrop M2-F3
 Pfalz D.XII
 Piper J-2 Cub
 Pitcairn PA-5 Mailwing
 Pitts S-1S Special
 Royal Aircraft Factory F.E.8
 Rutan Model 76 Voyager
 Rutan/Scaled Composites Model 316 SpaceShipOne
 Ryan NYP Spirit of St. Louis
 Sopwith 7F.1 Snipe
 SPAD S.XIII Smith IV
 Supermarine Spitfire HF. Mk. VIIc
 Voisin VIII
 Wittman Buster Chief Oshkosh
 Wright EX Vin Fiz Flyer
 1903 Wright Flyer
 1909 Wright Military Flyer

Aircraft displayed at the Steven F. Udvar-Hazy Center

Opened in 2003, the Steven F. Udvar-Hazy Center, located near Washington Dulles International Airport in Fairfax County, Virginia, features thousands of artifacts for which insufficient space could be found for display in the museum's National Mall building. The James S. McDonnell Space Hangar, opened in 2004, is incorporated into the Udvar-Hazy Center.

 Aeronca C-2 Collegian
 Aichi M6A1 Seiran
 American Aerolights Double Eagle
 Arado Ar 234 B-2 Blitz
 Arlington Sisu 1A
 Arrow Sport A2-60
 Autogiro Company of America AC-35
 Baldwin Red Devil
 Beck-Mahoney Sorceress
 Bede BD-5B
 Beechcraft 35 Bonanza Waikiki Beech
 Beechcraft Model 18 "Twin Beech"
 Beechcraft King Air
 Bell 206L-1 LongRanger II Spirit of Texas
 Bell Model 30 Genevieve
 Bell H-13J
 Bell 47B
 Bell AH-1F Cobra
 Bell UH-1H Iroquois Smokey III
 Bell XV-15 TRRA
 Bellanca CF
 Benoist-Korn Type XII
 Bensen B-6 Gyroglider
 Bensen B-8M Gyrocopter Spirit of Kitty Hawk
 Boeing 307 Stratoliner Clipper Flying Cloud
 Boeing 367-80
 Boeing B-29 Superfortress Enola Gay
 Boeing FB-5 Hawk
 Boeing P-26A Peashooter
 Boeing-Stearman Model 75 "Kaydet"
 Bowlus 1-S-2100 Senior Albatross Falcon
 Bowlus BA-100 Baby Albatross
 Bücker Bü 133C Jungmeister
 CASA 352L
 Caudron G.4
 Cessna O-1A Bird Dog
 Cessna 152
 Cessna 180 Spirit of Columbus
 Chance-Vought RF-8G Crusader
 Concorde
 Cosmos Phase II
 Curtiss 1A "Gulfhawk"
 Curtiss F9C-2 Sparrowhawk
 Curtiss JN-4D Jenny
 Curtiss KD2C-2 Skeet
 Curtiss Model E Flying Boat
 Curtiss N-9H
 Curtiss P-40E Kittyhawk
 Curtiss SB2C-5 Helldiver
 DSI/NASA Oblique Wing RPV
 Dassault Falcon 20
 De Havilland Canada DHC-1A Chipmunk
 Delta Wing Mariah M-9
 Delta Wing Model 162
 Delta Wing Phoenix VI.B
 Delta Wing Streak
 Delta Wing Viper 175
 Dornier Do 335A-1 Pfeil
 Double Eagle II Gondola
 Douglas M-2
 Eipper-Formance Cumulus 10
 Fairchild FC-2W2 Stars and Stripes
 Farman Sport
 Focke-Achgelis Fa 330 A-1
 Focke-Wulf Fw 190 F-8/R1
 Fowler-Gage Tractor
 Frankfort TG-1A
 Fulton Airphibian
 General Atomics MQ-1 Predator
 Globe XKD5G-1
 Globe Swift GC-1A
 Grob 102 Standard Astir III
 Grumman A-6E Intruder
 Grumman C-164 Ag-Cat
 Grumman F-14 Tomcat
 Grumman F6F-3 Hellcat
 Grumman F8F-2 Bearcat Conquest I
 Grumman G-21 Goose
 Grumman G-22 Gulfhawk II
 Grunau Baby II B-2
 Gyro 2000 Ikenga 530Z
 Gyrodyne QH-50C DASH
 Halberstadt CL.IV
 Hawker Hurricane Mk.IIC
 Heinkel He 219
 Hiller Flying Platform
 Hiller XH-44
 Hiller XHOE-1 Hornet
 Hiller YROE
 Horten Ho 229
 Horten H.IIIF
 Horten H.IIIH
 Horten VI V2
 Huff-Daland Duster
 Kaman K-225
 Kawanishi N1K2-Ja Shiden Kai
 Kawasaki Ki-45 Toryu
 Kellett XO-60
 Kreider-Reisner C-4C Challenger
 Kugisho MXY7 Ohka Model 22
 Kyushu J7W1 Shinden
 Laird-Turner Meteor LTR-14
 Langley Aerodrome A
 Lear Jet 23
 Lippisch DM-1
 Lockheed 1049F-55-96 Constellation
 Lockheed Martin X-35B Joint Strike Fighter
 Lockheed P-38J Lightning
 Lockheed SR-71A Blackbird
 Lockheed T-33A Shooting Star
 Loening OA-1A San Francisco
 Loudenslager Laser 200
 MacCready Gossamer Albatross
 Manta Pterodactyl Fledgling
 Martin B-26 Marauder Flak Bait
 Martin PTV-N-2 Gorgon IV
 McDonnell KDH-1 Katydid
 McDonnell F-4S Phantom II
 McDonnell Douglas F/A-18C Hornet
 Messerschmitt Me 163 Komet
 Mignet HM.14 Pou du Ciel La Cucaracha
 Mikoyan-Gurevich MiG-15bis
 Mikoyan-Gurevich MiG-21F-13
 Mitchell U-2 Superwing
 Monnett Moni
 Monocoupe 110 Special Little Butch
 Mooney M-18C Mite
 Nagler-Rolz NR 54 V2
 Nakajima J1N1-S Gekko
 Nakajima Kikka
 Naval Aircraft Factory N3N
 Nelson BB-1 Dragonfly
 Nieuport 28 C.1
 North American F-86A Sabre
 North American F-100 Super Sabre
 North American P-51C Mustang Excalibur III
 North American Rockwell Shrike Commander 500S Sweetie Face
 Northrop N-1M
 Northrop P-61C Black Widow
 P-V Engineering Forum PV-2
 Pathfinder Plus
 Piper J-3 Cub
 Piper PA-12 Super Cruiser City of Washington
 Piper PA-18 Super Cub
 Piper PA-23 Apache
 Pitts Special S-1C Little Stinker
 Republic F-105D Thunderchief
 Republic P-47D Thunderbolt
 Robinson R22
 Robinson R44 Astro
 Rotorway Scorpion Too
 Rutan Quickie
 Rutan VariEze
 Ryan PT-22A Recruit
 SPAD XVI
 Schweizer SGU 2-22EK
 Sharp DR 90 Nemesis
 Sikorsky HH-52A Seaguard
 Sikorsky HO5S-1
 Sikorsky JRS-1
 Sikorsky YH-19A
 Sikorsky X2
 Space Shuttle Discovery
 Sportwings Valkyrie
 Stanley Nomad
 Stinson L-5 Sentinel
 Stits SA-2A Sky Baby
 Story Little Gee Bee
 Sukhoi Su-26M
 Travel Air D4D
 Ultraflight Sales Ltd. Lazair SS EC
 Verville Sperry Messenger
 Virgin Atlantic Global Flyer
 Vought F4U-1D Corsair
 Vought-Sikorsky OS2U-3 Kingfisher
 Vought-Sikorsky XR-4C
 Waterman Aerobile
 Weedhopper JC-24C
 Westland Lysander
 1908 Wright Military Flyer-reproduction

Aircraft at the Paul E. Garber Facility

Located in Suitland, Maryland, the Paul E. Garber Preservation, Restoration, and Storage Facility is a 32-building complex used for storage and restoration of aircraft and spacecraft in the National Air and Space Museum collection. The Garber Facility's collection of aerospacecraft is in the process of being transferred to the Steven F. Udvar-Hazy Center. It is planned that in the future, all restoration work performed by the NASM on its exhibits will be conducted at the Udvar-Hazy Center.

 Abrams P-1 Explorer
 Aichi B7A2 Ryusei
 Antonov An-2
 Applebay Zuni II
 Arado Ar 196 A-5
 Bachem Ba 349 B-1 Natter
 Bell Model 65 ATV (Air Test Vehicle)
 Bell P-39Q Airacobra
 Bell P-63A Kingcobra
 Bellanca 14-13
 Blohm & Voss BV 155 V2
 Boeing KC-97G Stratotanker – cockpit and rear fuselage only
Bücker Bü 181 B-1 Bestmann
 Cessna O-2A
 Cierva C.8W
 Convair 240
 Convair XFY-1 Pogo
 Convair XF2Y-1 Sea Dart
 Culver TD2C-1
 Curtiss (NAF) TS-2/3
 Curtiss-Wright X-100
 Custer CCW-1
 de Havilland DH.98 Mosquito
 Douglas A-1H Skyraider
 ERCO Ercoupe 415-C
 Fairchild PT-19A Cornell
 Felixstowe F5L – hull only
 Focke-Wulf Ta 152 H-0/R11
 Goodyear Inflatoplane
 Grumman F9F-6 Cougar
 Grumman Tarpon I
 Heinkel He 162 A-2 Spatz
 Helio Courier
 Herrick HV-2A Vertaplane
 Helwan HA-200B Al-Kahira
 Ilyushin Il-2
 Junkers Ju 388 L-1
 J.V. Martin K.III Kitten
 Kawanishi N1K1 Kyofu
 Kugisho P1Y1 Ginga
 Lockheed XC-35 Electra
 McDonnell RF-101C Voodoo – nose only
 McDonnell XHJD-1 Whirlaway
 McDonnell XV-1
 McDonnell F-4A Phantom II Sageburner
 Messerschmitt Me 410 A-3/U1
 Mitsubishi G4M3 Model 34 Betty – nose and fuselage section only
 Morane-Saulnier MS.500
 Nakajima B6N2 Tenzan
 Nakajima C6N1-S Saiun
 Naval Aircraft Modification Unit KDN Gorgon
 Noorduyn YC-64 Norseman IV
 North American FJ-1 Fury
 North American O-47A
 North American SNJ-4
 Northrop T-38 Talon
 Northrop XP-56 Black Bullet
 P-V Engineering Forum XHRP-X
 Platt-LePage XR-1
 Republic XP-84 Thunderjet – Forward fuselage only
 Republic RC-3 Seabee
 Saab J 29F Tunnan
 Schempp-Hirth Nimbus-2
 Sikorsky XR-5
 Stearman-Hammond Y-1S
 Stout Skycar
 Vertol VZ-2A
 Verville Sport Trainer AT
 Vultee BT-13A Valiant
 Waco 9
 Waco UIC
 Waterman Whatsit
 Windecker Eagle
 Yakovlev Yak-18

Aircraft at the National Museum of African American History and Culture
The National Museum of African American History and Culture has on display a restored World War II-era PT-13 Stearman biplane, used to train Tuskegee Airmen at Moton Field.

Aircraft on loan

 Akerman Tailless
 Berliner Helicopter No. 5
 Curtiss NC-4
 Curtiss-Wright XP-55 Ascender
 Consolidated PBY-5 Catalina
 de Havilland DH.4 (replica)
 Douglas VB-26B Invader
 Focke-Wulf Fw 190 D-9
 Kugisho MXY7 K-2 Ohka
 Martin PBM-5A Mariner
 Mitsubishi A6M7 Model 63 Zero
 Nakajima Ki-43 Hayabusa
 Nakajima Ki-115 Tsurugi
 Piper L-4 Grasshopper
 Ryan X-13 Vertijet
 Stinson SR-10F Reliant
 Vought V-173 
 Wiseman-Cooke

References

Aerospace museums in Washington, D.C.

Smithsonian Institution